Schistostoma is a genus of flies in the family Dolichopodidae, subfamily Microphorinae.

Species
At least 50 extant species have been described in the genus, with 16 from the Palaearctic realm, two from the Oriental realm, four from the Afrotropical realm, and 28 from the Nearctic realm. Two fossil species have also been described from Burmese amber. There are also several undescribed species from the Palaearctic realm, and one undescribed species from the Afrotropical realm.

 Schistostoma albopilosum (Becker, 1910)
 Schistostoma armipes (Melander, 1928)
 Schistostoma arnaudi Brooks & Cumming, 2022
 Schistostoma asiaticum Shamshev, 1993
 Schistostoma atratum (Coquillett, 1900)
 Schistostoma borkenti Brooks & Cumming, 2022
 Schistostoma brandbergense Shamshev & Sinclair, 2006
 †Schistostoma burmanicum Brooks, Cumming & Grimaldi, 2019 Burmese amber, Cenomanian
 Schistostoma caroleae Brooks & Cumming, 2022
 Schistostoma chloeae Brooks & Cumming, 2022
 Schistostoma cirripes (Melander, 1940)
 Schistostoma cucullatum Collin, 1949
 Schistostoma deemingi Gatt, 2014
 Schistostoma discretum Collin, 1949
 Schistostoma eremita Becker, 1902
 Schistostoma evisceratum (Melander, 1940)
 Schistostoma fitzgeraldi Brooks & Cumming, 2022
 Schistostoma flavipes Chvala, 1987
 †Schistostoma foliatum Brooks, Cumming & Grimaldi, 2019 Burmese amber, Cenomanian
 Schistostoma golbeki Shamshev, 1993
 Schistostoma grootaerti Chvala, 1987
 Schistostoma heatherae Brooks & Cumming, 2022
 Schistostoma indicum Shamshev, 2020
 Schistostoma isommatum (Melander, 1928)
 Schistostoma kalkgat Shamshev & Sinclair, 2006
 Schistostoma kovalevi Shamshev, 1993
 Schistostoma lillyae Brooks & Cumming, 2022
 Schistostoma longistylum Brooks & Cumming, 2022
 Schistostoma michaeli Brooks & Cumming, 2022
 Schistostoma mongolicum Shamshev, 1991
 Schistostoma negrobovi Shamshev, 2021
 Schistostoma nigrescens Becker, 1907
 Schistostoma nigricauda (Becker, 1908)
 Schistostoma nigrosetosum Chvala, 1987
 Schistostoma oharai Brooks & Cumming, 2022
 Schistostoma pecki Brooks & Cumming, 2022
 Schistostoma powelli Brooks & Cumming, 2022
 Schistostoma pseudoflavipes Shamshev, 1993
 Schistostoma ravidum (Coquillett, 1895)
 Schistostoma robustum (Melander, 1928)
 Schistostoma rudei Brooks & Cumming, 2022
 Schistostoma runyoni Brooks & Cumming, 2022
 Schistostoma shamshevi Brooks & Cumming, 2022
 Schistostoma sinclairi Brooks & Cumming, 2022
 Schistostoma strigilifer (Melander, 1940)
 Schistostoma stuckenbergi Chvala, 1991
 Schistostoma susanae Brooks & Cumming, 2022
 Schistostoma sycophantor (Melander, 1902)
 Schistostoma tacomae (Melander, 1940)
 Schistostoma thalhammeri Chvala, 1987
 Schistostoma truncatum (Loew, 1864)
 Schistostoma turkmenicum Shamshev, 1993
 Schistostoma yakimense (Melander, 1928)

References

Dolichopodidae genera
Microphorinae
Taxa named by Theodor Becker